Fazia  is a genus of hoverflies, formerly treated as a subgenus of Allograpta (e.g.), but now treated as a genus, though not monophyletic as presently defined.

Species
Fazia alta (Curran, 1936)
Fazia altissima (Fluke, 1942)
Fazia argentipila (Fluke, 1942)
Fazia centropogonis (Nishida, 2002)
Fazia colombia (Curran, 1925)
Fazia decemmaculata (Rondani, 1863)
Fazia eupeltata (Bigot, 1884)
Fazia fasciata (Curran, 1932)
Fazia fascifrons (Macquart, 1846)
Fazia flukei (Curran, 1936)
Fazia funeralia (Hull, 1944)
Fazia hians (Enderlein, 1938)
Fazia imitator (Curran, 1925)
Fazia luna (Fluke, 1942)
Fazia macquarti (Blanchard, 1852)
Fazia micrura (Osten Sacken, 1877)
Fazia mu (Bigot, 1884)
Fazia nasigera Enderlein, 1938
Fazia plaumanni (Frey, 1946)
Fazia remigis (Fluke, 1942)
Fazia roburoris (Fluke, 1942)
Fazia rostrata (Bigot, 1884)
Fazia saussurii (Giglio-Tos, 1892)
Fazia similis (Curran, 1925)
Fazia strigifacies Enderlein, 1938
Fazia syrphica (Giglio-Tos, 1892)
Fazia willistoni (Giglio-Tos, 1893)

References

Syrphini
Hoverfly genera